Jesus "Chuy" Sanchez (born December 25, 1990) is a Mexican professional footballer who plays as a midfielder.

Career

College and youth
Sanchez played four years college soccer at Cal State Bakersfield between 2009 and 2012.

Sanchez signed with USL PDL club Kitsap Pumas in 2013, but never played due to work permit issues. He made 11 appearances and scored 5 goals in 2014.

Professional
Sanchez signed with United Soccer League club Oklahoma City Energy on January 29, 2015.

References

1990 births
Living people
Mexican expatriate footballers
Mexican footballers
Cal State Bakersfield Roadrunners men's soccer players
Kitsap Pumas players
OKC Energy FC players
Association football midfielders
Footballers from Sinaloa
Sportspeople from Mazatlán
Expatriate soccer players in the United States
USL League Two players
USL Championship players